The 1875 Blackburn by-election was fought on 30 September 1875.  The by-election was fought due to the death of the incumbent Conservative MP, Henry Master Feilden.  It was won by the Conservative candidate Daniel Thwaites.

References

1875 elections in the United Kingdom
1875 in England
1870s in Lancashire
Politics of Blackburn with Darwen
By-elections to the Parliament of the United Kingdom in Lancashire constituencies
September 1875 events